Volkswagen Blues is a French-language road novel by French-Canadian writer Jacques Poulin, his sixth, originally published by Québec-Amérique in 1984.

Inspired by the writings of Jack Kerouac and the Beat Generation poets, some of whom appear in the book's later chapters, the novel explores the American landscape and cultural history from the vantage point of the open road, using writers, historical figures, popular music and art as tropes to orient the reader and tell the story of America.

Plot
Volkswagen Blues begins with its protagonist, a middle-aged, formerly successful writer from Quebec, who has adopted the ironic pen-name Jack Waterman (a metonymy playing on Waterman pens), experiencing a bout of writer's block. Having discovered an old postcard, Jack embarks on a quest to reconnect with its sender, his long-lost, rambling brother, Théo. Early into the narrative, Jack picks up a hitchhiker, a young Métisse woman, nicknamed "La Grande Sauterelle" due her long, grasshopper-like legs, as a travel companion, as well as a cat named Chop Suey.

Together in Jack's Volkswagen Minibus, which through personification becomes a character in the story, they travel from Gaspé to San Francisco, passing through Toronto, Detroit, Chicago, St. Louis, Kansas City and the American West along their way, exploring the history of European contact with the native people of the Americas. While on the road, they discuss language, literature, music, expansionism, the Oregon Trail, etc., and their trip  becomes an allegory for the history of the French exploration of North America. At the same time, La Grande Sauterelle, who is struggling with her own identity, presents another version of American history, as recounted by indigenous peoples, where "discovery" is viewed as "invasion." Throughout the episodic novel a number of interesting and entertaining characters appear, including journalists, museum directors, railroad hoboes and writers such as Saul Bellow and Lawrence Ferlinghetti, as well as the spirit of Jimmie Rodgers, Ernest Hemingway, John Muir and the Beat Generation.

Jack's journey through an America that scholar Paul Socken describes as a "lost paradise" is one of disillusionment and self-discovery that allows him to break through the impasse he had met in his writing.

Reception
Volkswagen Blues was nominated for the Governor General's Award for French-language fiction at the 1984 Governor General's Awards and was one of the selected novels in the 2005 edition of Canada Reads, where it was championed by author and former National Librarian of Canada, Roch Carrier.

Volkswagen Blues was individually cited when Jacques Poulin was awarded the Prix Gilles-Corbeil (informally known as the "Nobel québécois").

Translations
Volkswagen Blues was translated into English by Sheila Fischman and published by McClelland & Stewart in 1988 and subsequently re-issued by Cormorant Books in 2002.

See also
 Paul G. Socken, The Myth of the Lost Paradise in the Novels of Jacques Poulin. Fairleigh Dickinson UP, 1993.
 Anne Marie Miraglia, L'Ecriture de l'Autre chez Jacques Poulin. Editions Balzac, 1993.
 Roger Hyman. "Writing against Knowing, Writing against Certainty; or What's Really under the Veranda in Jacques Poulin's Volkswagen Blues": Journal of Canadian Studies 34.3 (1999).
 Jean Morency, et al., Romans de la route et voyages identitaires. Québec: Nota Bene (collection "Terre américaine"), 2006.

External links
Prix Gilles-Corbeil («Nobel québécois») 2008 announcement 

1984 Canadian novels
Canadian French-language novels
McClelland & Stewart books